Josh Hart (born September 16, 1983) is an American self made entrepreneur, owner of Burnyzz Speed Shop in Ocala, Florida and owner/driver of the R+L Carriers / TechNet Professional NHRA Top Fuel Dragster in the Camping World NHRA Drag Racing Series. In his first professional Top Fuel race, he won the 2021 NHRA Gatornationals in Gainesville, Florida.   At the NHRA Carolina Nationals in September, 2021, he captured his second win of the season.
He finished the 2021 season 11th in points. After a successful rookie season, Hart made crew chief, Ron Douglas, a partner in the race team. The Josh Hart Racing team is now based in Brownsburg, Indiana, just outside Indianapolis. 

In 2022, Hart plans to run the entire NHRA schedule and compete for the Top Fuel championship.

Personal life

Joshua "Josh" Hart was born in Huntington, Indiana. In 2010 Josh and his wife Brittanie, moved to Ocala, Florida and founded Burnyzz Speed Shop. They named the business after watching the movie "Weekend at Bernie's" on TV. In 2019, daughter, Helen Londyn Hart, joined their family. The family business expanded to Burnyzz 2.0 and opened in the summer of 2021.

The opening of Burnyzz 2.0 expanded Burnyzz Speed Shop and full-service auto center to over 100,000 square feet under one roof and encompasses an entire city block. Buymetalbuildingsdirect.com, which spent 14 months building Hart’s $5 million investment, is also a sponsor of his race team.

Josh and Brittanie Hart's additional businesses include Modern Muscle Cars, Hart2Hart Photography and Tuxedo Car Storage.

Among Josh's mentors is Big Daddy Don Garlits, also a resident of Ocala.

NHRA career
Hart became an NHRA drag racer in 2011, racing a variety of sportsman vehicles. After earning his Top Alcohol Dragster license in 2015, Hart won three NHRA National event titles and eight NHRA regional TAD races between 2017 and 2019. Hart won the NHRA Regional Champions in 2017 and is a two-time NHRA U.S. Nationals winner (2018–19). He finished his Top Alcohol Dragster career in 2020 with a best time of 5.12 at 283 mph. After earning his Top Fuel license in 2020, driving for Bob Vandergriff Racing, Hart elected to start his own race team. In 2021 Hart stepped up to the professional class of NHRA, driving a Top Fuel dragster.

Sponsors
Hart has been sponsored by TechNet Professional Auto Service, a professional service provided by Advance Auto Parts, since 2017. At the 2021 NHRA Summit Racing Equipment Nationals in Norwalk, Ohio, Hart debuted a sponsorship with R+L Carriers. R+L Carriers renewed their sponsorship to be a primary sponsor in 2022.
 R+L Carriers
 TechNet Professional Auto Service
 Advance Auto Parts
 Burnyzz
 Show Stoppers Collector Car Auction
  BuyMetalBuildingsDirect.com
 HLC Trucking Company
 Ohio West Virginia Excavating Co.
 Bowles Roofing Co.

Top Fuel Dragster

2021

 Top Fuel Winner at Gainesville, FL - Amalie Oil NHRA Gatornationals
 Top Fuel Winner at Charlotte, NC - Dewalt Tools NHRA Carolina Nationals

Top Alcohol Dragster

2020 
 Top Alcohol Dragster Winner at Baby Gators, Gainesville, FL - Lucas Oil Series
 JEGS Allstar Top Alcohol Dragster Runner Up at Indianapolis, IN
 Top Alcohol Dragster Runner Up at NHRA U.S. Nationals

2019 
 Top Alcohol Dragster Winner at Baby Gators, Gainesville, FL - Lucas Oil Series
 Top Alcohol Dragster Winner at Epping, NH - Lucas Oil Series
 Top Alcohol Dragster Runner-Up at Atco, NJ - Lucas Oil Series
 Top Alcohol Dragster Winner at Indianapolis, IN - Lucas Oil Series

2018 
 Top Alcohol Dragster Runner Up at Gainesville, FL - NHRA Gatornationals
 Top Alcohol Dragster Winner at Atlanta, GA - NHRA Southern Nationals
 Top Alcohol Dragster Winner at Indianapolis, IN - NHRA U.S. Nationals
 Top Alcohol Dragster Winner at Indianapolis - Lucas Oil Series
 Top Alcohol Dragster Winner at Atco, NJ - Lucas Oil Series
 Top Alcohol Dragster Runner-Up at Epping, NH - Lucas Oil Series
 Top Alcohol Dragster Runner-Up Maple Grove, PA - Lucas Oil Series

2017 
 Top Alcohol Dragster Winner at Lebanon Valley, NY - Lucas Oil Series
 Top Alcohol Dragster Winner at Epping, NH - Lucas Oil Series
 Top Alcohol Dragster Winner at Atco, NJ - Lucas Oil Series
 Top Alcohol Dragster Runner-Up at Rising Sun, MD - Lucas Oil Series
 Top Alcohol Dragster Winner at Indianapolis, IN - NHRA U.S. Nationals
 Lucas Oil East Region Top Alcohol Dragster Points Champion

2016 
 Top Alcohol Dragster Winner at Atco, NJ - Lucas Oil Series
 Top Alcohol Dragster Winner at Bowling Green, KY - Lucas Oil Series
 Top Alcohol Dragster Runner-Up at Charlotte, NC, 4-Wide Nationals
 Top Alcohol Dragster Runner-Up at Epping, N.H. - Lucas Oil Series

References

External links

 Crew Chief Ron Douglas Made Partner in Josh Hart Racing
 From Bad Boy to Business Leader

 TechNet Continues with Josh Hart in 2022
 Josh Hart Features Pink Breast Cancer Dragster at Bristol

1983 births
Living people
People from Ocala, Florida